Germany–Mexico relations are the diplomatic relations between Germany and Mexico. Both nations are members of the G-20 major economies, Organisation for Economic Co-operation and Development and the United Nations.

History

19th century

German clergy and technical mining personnel arrived in colonial Mexico in the late eighteenth and early nineteenth centuries. One of the first contacts between Germany and Mexico was via the scientific expedition of Prussian aristocrat Alexander von Humboldt, who arrived in Mexico in 1803 and remained for a year mapping Mexican topography, examining its mining sector, and studying its culture and history. Diplomatic relations between Mexico and Germany were established on 23 January 1879 after the unification of Germany.

During the Second Mexican Empire and the reign of Maximilian I of Mexico, Germans were brought to Mexico to settle in Mexico's southern states, primarily in Yucatán. In 1890, Mexican President Porfirio Díaz and German Chancellor Otto von Bismarck collaborated to bring 450 German families to the Mexican state of Chiapas where they settled in the town of Soconusco to develop the region's agriculture industry. Several German migrants would immigrate to primarily northern Mexico and helped develop several towns such as the port of Mazatlán and Mexico's brewing industry.

20th century

During World War I (1914-1918) Mexico remained neutral. During this time, Mexico was preoccupied with its revolution (1910-1920) which took place the same time as World War I. In January 1917, British agents intercepted a telegram sent to German Ambassador to Mexico Heinrich von Eckardt by Arthur Zimmermann, State Secretary for Foreign Affairs of the German Empire. In the telegram, Germany proposed to Mexico that if the United States were to join the war, Mexico should join and side with the Central Powers. In appreciation, and if the Central Powers were to win, Mexico would recuperate the territories of Texas, New Mexico, and Arizona, which Mexico had lost in its war against the United States during the Mexican–American War in 1848. The telegram, known as the Zimmermann Telegram was intercepted when the telegram was being wired to the German embassy in Washington, DC, to be rerouted to Mexico City. Mexico eventually rejected the telegram and continued to remain neutral during the war.

During the Spanish Civil War (1936–1939), Mexico and Germany supported opposing sides of the conflict, with Mexico supporting the Republicans and Germany supporting the Nationalists. That put Mexico and Germany against each other and ultimately caused a largely-negative interaction between them.

On 22 May 1942, Mexico declared war on Germany during World War II. Mexico is one of only two Latin American nations to contribute soldiers during the war (the other nation being Brazil). More Mexican troops fought in the Philippines than in Europe. However this did not discourage Germany from making their own visits. Diplomatic relations between the two nations were re-established on 16 April 1952.

After World War II, Mexico maintained diplomatic relations with both the Federal Republic of Germany (West Germany) and the German Democratic Republic (East Germany). Mexico then maintained an embassy in Bonn. After the reunification of Germany in 1990, Mexico established relations with the Federal Republic of Germany and in the year 2000, Mexico moved its embassy to its current location in Berlin.

21st century
There have been several high-level visits between leaders of both nations. In June 2017, German Chancellor, Angela Merkel, made an official visit to Mexico, and met with Mexican President Enrique Peña Nieto. Both leaders reaffirmed the strength of the bilateral relationship, which is based on shared values such as democracy and the promotion of free trade. Both nations all focused on the joint collaboration in the defense of multilateralism, cooperation for sustainable development, attention to the migration phenomenon and the fight against climate change, among other issues.

In September 2022, German President Frank-Walter Steinmeier paid a visit to Mexico and met with Mexican President Andrés Manuel López Obrador. During the visit, Steinmeier urged the Mexican government to stand with Europe in opposing the Russian invasion of Ukraine.

High-level visits

High-level visits from Germany to Mexico

 Secretary General of East Germany Erich Honecker (1981)
 Chancellor of West Germany and unified Germany Helmut Kohl (1984, 1996)
 President Roman Herzog (1999)
 Chancellor Gerhard Schröder (2002)
 President Johannes Rau (2003)
 President Horst Köhler (2004)
 Chancellor Angela Merkel (2008, 2012, 2017)
 President Christian Wulff (2011)
 President Frank-Walter Steinmeier (2022)

High-level visits from Mexico to Germany

 President Adolfo López Mateos (1963)
 President Luis Echeverría Álvarez (1974)
 President Miguel de la Madrid Hurtado (1985)
 President Carlos Salinas de Gortari (1991)
 President Ernesto Zedillo (1997)
 President Vicente Fox (January and October 2001, 2003)
 President Felipe Calderón (January and June 2007, 2010)
 President Enrique Peña Nieto (2016, 2017, 2018)

Bilateral agreements
Both nations have signed several bilateral agreement such as an Agreement for the Protection of the Rights of Author of Musical Works (1954); Agreement on Reciprocity in Legal Aid (1956); Agreement of Air Transportation (1967); Agreement of Scientific and Technological Cooperation (1974); Agreement of Cultural Cooperation (1977); Agreement on the Promotion and Reciprocal Protection of Investments (1998); Agreement to Avoid Double Taxation and Tax Evasion in Income Tax and Equity Tax (2008) and an Agreement of Technical Cooperation (2012).

Migration 
There is a sizable German origin community in Mexico that thrives and several prominent Mexican politicians, journalists, artists and actors are of German descent. There is also a Mennonite community in Mexico with approximately 100,000 members in Northern Mexico of predominantly German origin.

Transportation
There are direct flights between both nations with the following airlines: Condor and Lufthansa.

Trade relations 
In 1997, Mexico signed a Free Trade Agreement with the European Union (which includes Germany). In 2018, two-trade between both nations amounted to US$24.8 billion. Germany is Mexico's biggest trading partner within the European Union and fifth biggest globally. At the same time, Mexico is Germany's second biggest trading partner in Latin America (after Brazil). Germany's main exports to Mexico include: machinery, automobiles, chemical based products, pharmaceutical products and medical technology. Mexico's main exports to Germany include: automobiles and automotive parts, as well as products from the electronics industry.

There are over 1,300 German companies based in Mexico with a total capital amounting to US$25 billion. Several German multinational companies invest and operate in Mexico such as Audi, Bayer, BMW, Deutsche Bank, Mercedes-Benz, Siemens and Volkswagen (among others). Mexican multinational companies such as Cemex, Grupo Alfa, Mexichem and Nemak (among others) operate in Germany.

Resident diplomatic missions 
 Germany has an embassy in Mexico City.
 Mexico has an embassy in Berlin and a consulate in Frankfurt.

See also 
 German Mexicans
 Mexicans in Germany

References 

 
Mexico
Bilateral relations of Mexico